The knockout stage of the 2021 CONCACAF Gold Cup began on 24 July 2021 with the quarter-finals and ended on 1 August 2021 with the final at the Allegiant Stadium in Paradise.

All match times listed are EDT (UTC−4), as listed by CONCACAF. The local time is also given.

Format
In the knockout stage, if a match was level at the end of 90 minutes of normal playing time, extra time was played (two periods of 15 minutes each), where each team was allowed to make a sixth substitution. If still tied after extra time, the match was decided by a penalty shoot-out to determine the winners.

Qualified teams
The top two placed teams from each of the four groups qualified for the knockout stage.

Bracket

Quarter-finals

Qatar vs El Salvador

Mexico vs Honduras

Costa Rica vs Canada

United States vs Jamaica

Semi-finals

Qatar vs United States

Mexico vs Canada

Final

References

External links
 

Knockout stage